John Cyllberg (born 23 April 1896 in Harestad, died 10 August 1983 in Uppsala) was a Swedish theologian and Bishop of Västerås between 1940 and 1962.

Biography 
After studies at Gothenburg University College Bachelor of Arts in 1915. After further studies at Uppsala University Licentiate of Art 1919, Bachelor of Divinity in 1922, Doctor of Philosophy in 1926, docent of philosophy of religion 1926 and Doctor of Divinity in 1933. Served as acting professor of theological encyclopedia in 1928–1929 and 1936 at Uppsala University. Ordained as priest in the Church of Sweden in 1928. Served as vicar in Balingsta, Hagby and Ramsta near Uppsala 1933–1940. Elected as bishop of the Diocese of Västerås in 1940, an office which he held until his retirement in 1962.

References
 Vem är det 1943 p 162. runeberg.org 
 Svensk uppslagsbok vol 6 column 699 Förlagshuset Norden 1955

1896 births
1983 deaths
Bishops of Västerås
Swedish theologians
20th-century Protestant theologians
Grand Crosses with Star and Sash of the Order of Merit of the Federal Republic of Germany